Surveillance is a novel by Jonathan Raban.

References 
The Guardian 20 May 2006  "We have mutated into a surveillance society – and must share the blame" 
The Guardian 30 September 2006 "We're all spooks now" 
The Telegraph 12 September 2006 "The Insider: don't smile, you're on camera"

External links
Pantheon Books 

2006 British novels
Picador (imprint) books